Back from the Grave, Volume 8 (CD), is numerically, though not chronologically, the fifth installment on campact disc in the Back from the Grave series of garage rock compilations assembled by Tim Warren of Crypt Records.  It was released on August 26,1996.  The primary reason why there were no releases for Volumes 5, 6, and 7 in the CD-specific series (released between 1996 and 2000), is that the track listings on the albums and CD's differed dramatically, and that most of the songs included on the first seven volumes of the LP series were configured onto the first four CDs.  Making matters more complicated, Vol. 4 of the CD-specific series was actually released in 2000, four years after the release of Volume 8 (though the LP version of Volume 4 was released in 1996).  In 2015, a totally new re-mastered CD series of Back from the Grave is in the process of being released, which will adhere more closely to the track listings of the LPs, and will bring the series for the first time into multi-medium coherence.

Unlike the preceding four volumes in the CD-specific series, the tracks on Volume 8 corresponded almost exactly with the LP, containing all of the songs on the LP (in the same order), but with the addition of several bonus tracks.  In keeping with all of the entries in the series, and as indicated in the subheading which reads "Over 30 Cuts of Utter Snarling Mid-60's Garage Punkrock," this collection consists of many songs which display the rawer and more aggressive side of the genre and are often characterized by the use of fuzztone-distorted  guitars and rough vocals.  Accordingly, the set generally excludes psychedelic, folk rock, and pop-influenced material in favor of basic primitive rock and roll.  The packaging features a booklet containing well-researched liner notes written by Tim Warren which conveys basic information about each song and group, such as origin, recording date, and biographical sketches, usually written in a conversational style that includes occasional slang, anecdotes, humorous asides.  The liner notes are noticeably opinionated, sometimes engaging in tongue-in-cheek insults directed at other genres of music.  The booklet also includes photographs of the bands, and the front cover features a highly satirical cartoon by Mort Todd depicting revivified "rock and roll" zombies who, on this occasion, target none of their customary victims (aside from an occasional prong from their devils' pitchforks), but instead have turned up at the "mosh pit" at a 1990s "Lolabigloozzaz" festival, delightfully holding up "mosh pit cookbooks" (i.e. suggesting that the sixties garage bands were the precursors of all this), while hordes of Prozac-dependent "rejects" slam dance in the mud-drenched melee below.

The set begins with the bongo-punctuated revved-up drive of "Alright," by the Groop, from Ohio, which was recorded at A&T Studios in Toledo, which is followed by "Can't Tame Me," by the Benders from Michigan.  Adrian Lloyd then delivers a screaming vocal in, "Lorna."  The Chancellors from Potsdam, New York sing sarcastically about traveling around the country in "On Tour."  The Bojax, from Greenville, South Carolina released a single in 1967 on Panther records, "Go Ahead and Go," which is included here and was produced by Rudy Wyatt of fellow Greenville band, the Wyld, who perform the next cut, "Goin' Places."  The Painted Ship, from Vancouver, Canada, appear on two tracks, "She Said Yes" and then, later in the set, "Little White Lies."  The Merlin Tree from Austin, Texas also provide two songs: first the guitar-overdriven protopunk of "Look in Your Mirror," the later "How to Win Friends."  "I Don't Want to Try It Again" was the debut single by the Dagenites, from Oxon Hill, Maryland, who shared the same manager with Link Wray.  The Dry Grins from Lafayette, Louisiana sing the organ-infused "She's a Drag."  Satyn's Children close the set with "Don't Go."

Track listing

The Groop: "Alright!" 2:42    
The Benders: "Can't Tame Me" 1:57    
Adrian Lloyd: "Lorna" 2:26     
Nightriders: "With Friends Like You, Who Needs Friends" 2:11    
The Chancellors: "On Tour" 2:46    
The Pseudos: "A Long Way to Nowhere" 2:26      
The Bojax: "Go Ahead and Go" 2:00    
The Wyld: "Goin' Places" 2:37     
Elite U.F.O.: "Now Who's Good Enough" 2:32    
The Painted Ship: "And She Said Yes" 2:35    
The Merlynn Tree: "Look in Your Mirror" 2:30    
Dave Myers and the Disciples: "C'mon Love" 1:53    
Pulsating Heartbeats: "Talkin' About You" 2:52    
The Cindells: "Don't Bring Me Down" 2:00    
James T. and the Workers: "That Is All" 2:26    
The Outspoken Blues: "Not Right Now" 2:52    
The Painted Ship: "I Told Those Little White Lies" 2:36    
The Piece Kor: "All I Want Is My Baby Back" 2:55    
Cavedwellers: "Run Around" 2:05    
The Village Outcast: "The Girl I Used to Love" 2:01    
The New Fugitives: "That's Queer" 2:39    
The Dave Starky Five: "Hey Everybody" 1:56    
The Tikis: "We're on the Move" 2:09    
The Amberjacks: "Hey Eriq!" 2:19    
The Night Crawlers: "Want Me" 2:32    
The Dagenites  "I Don't Want to Try It Again" 2:27    
The Dogs: "Don't Try to Help Me" 1:57    
The Dry Grins: "She's a Drag" 2:05    
New Fugitives: "She's My Baby" 2:43    
The Merlynn Tree: "How to Win Friends" 2:30    
The Just Too Much: "She Gives Me Time" 2:25    
Satyn's Children: "Don't Go" 2:54

Catalogue and release information

Compact disc (Crypt CD: CR-0062, rel. 1996)

References

Back From the Grave, Volume 8 (CD)
1996 compilation albums